Anthony Harvey (1930–2017) was a British filmmaker.

Anthony or Tony Harvey may also refer to:

People
Anthony Harvey (footballer) (born 1973), Australian rules footballer
Tony Harvey (basketball), American basketball coach

See also
Tony Hervey (born 1985), American mixed martial artist